"Wake It Up" is the first single off E-40's 11th studio album The Ball Street Journal. It features Akon who uses the auto-tune effect. It was produced by Matt Price.

Music video
The music video for the song was released on iTunes and has also been shown on BET's 106 & Park.

Charts

References

2008 singles
E-40 songs
Akon songs
Songs written by Akon
2008 songs
Warner Records singles